This is a list of banks in Europe.

Largest banks in Europe 
The 20 largest banks in Europe by total assets, as of December 31, 2021.

Albania

Andorra

Armenia

HSBC Bank Armenia
ACBA-Credit Agricole Bank 
Ameriabank
Anelik Bank  
Araratbank  
Ardshinbank
Armbusinessbank
ArmSwissBank
Artsakhbank 
Bank Mellat 
Byblos Bank Armenia 
Converse Bank 
Evocabank  
InecoBank
Unibank
VTB Armenia

Austria
Adria Bank
Allianz Investmentbank
AlpenBank
American Express Bank Ltd
Anglo Irish Bank
Austria Wirtschaftsservice Gesellschaft (AWS)
Banco do Brasil
Bank Austria Creditanstalt
Bank Burgenland
Bank für Ärzte und Freie Berufe
Bank für Tirol und Vorarlberg
Bank Gutmann
Bank Sal.Oppenheim jr. & Cie
Bank Vontobel Österreich
Bank Winter & Co
Bankhaus Carl Spängler & Co
Bankhaus Krentschker & Co
Bankhaus Schelhammer & Schattera
BankPrivat
BAWAG P.S.K.
BKS Bank
Capital Bank-GRAWE Gruppe
Capital Bank International-GRAWE Group
Coface Austria Bank
Commerzbank
Commerzialbank Mattersburg im Burgenland
Constantia Privatbank
Deniz Bank
Deutsche Bank
Dexia Kommunalkredit Bank
direktanlage.at
easybank
ecetra Central European e-Finance
Erste Bank
European American Investment Bank
Factor-Bank
GE Money Bank
Generali Bank
Austrian Anadi Bank
Intermarket Bank
Kathrein & Co. Privatgeschäftsbank
Kommunalkredit Depotbank
LGT Bank
Meinl Bank
Oberbank
Österreichische Verkehrskreditbank
Österreichische Volksbank
Privatinvest Bank
Raiffeisen Zentralbank
Schoellerbank
Spar - Finanz - Investitions- und Vermittlungs-AG
Sparda Bank
UniCredit CAIB
Vakifbank International
Volkskreditbank
VTB Bank
Western Union International Bank
Wiener Privatbank Immobilieninvest

Azerbaijan

Belarus

Belgium

Central bank
National Bank of Belgium

Major banks
Belfius
BNP Paribas Fortis (BNP Paribas)
ING Belgium (ING Group)
KBC Bank

Minor banks
Antwerpse Diamantbank
Argenta Spaarbank
Banca Monte Paschi Belgio
Bank Degroof
Bank Delen & de Schaetzen Bank Delen of Bank de Schaetzen or "DDS Bank"
Bank J. Van Breda en C°
Banque Eni
Banque Transatlantique Belgium
Beobank
bpost bank
Byblos Bank Europe
CBC Banque
Commerzbank
Delta Lloyd Bank
Deutsche Bank
Ethias Bank
Euroclear Bank
Europabank
Goffin Bank
Keytrade Bank
MeDirect Bank Belgium (subsidiary of MeDirect Bank Malta - see List of banks in Malta)
Petercam
Puilaetco Dewaay Private Bankers
Puilaetco Private Bankers
Santander Benelux
SG Private Banking
Shizuoka Bank (Europe)
Triodos Bank
UBS Belgium
United Taiwan Bank
van de Put & C° Banque de Titres/Effectenbank S.C.A.
Van Lanschot Bankiers België

More information can be found at diplobel.us.

Bosnia and Herzegovina

Bulgaria

Allianz
BNP Paribas
Bulgarian American Credit Bank
Bulgarian National Bank
Bulgarian Postbank
Central Cooperative Bank
D Commerce Bank
DSK Bank
Deutsche Bank
Economic and Investment Bank
First Investment Bank
ING Bank
International Asset Bank
Investbank
ProCredit Bank
Raiffeisen Bank
TBI Bank
Tokuda Bank
Teximbank
Unicredit Bulbank
United Bulgarian Bank

Croatia

Licensed banks
Addiko Bank	
Banka Kovanica	
Croatia banka	
Erste & Steiermärkische Bank	
Hrvatska poštanska banka		
Imex banka	
Istarska kreditna banka Umag
Karlovačka banka
Kentbank	
Kreditna banka Zagreb	
OTP banka Hrvatska	
Partner banka
Podravska banka	
Primorska banka	
Privredna banka Zagreb
Raiffeisenbank Austria
Samoborska banka
Sberbank
Slatinska banka		
Zagrebačka banka

Licensed savings banks
Tesla štedna banka

Licensed housing savings banks
HPB-Stambena štedionica
PBZ stambena štedionica
Prva stambena štedionica
Raiffeisen stambena štedionica
Wüstenrot stambena štedionica

Other licensed institutions with full authorization
Croatian Bank for Reconstruction and Development

Representative offices of foreign banks
BKS Bank AG
Commerzbank AG
Deutsche Bank AG
LHB Internationale Handelsbank AG
Union de Banques Arabes et Françaises

Cyprus

Central Bank
Central Bank of Cyprus

Banks incorporated in Cyprus
Alpha Bank
Ancoria Bank
Bank of Cyprus
Cyprus Development Bank
Eurobank
Hellenic Bank
Housing Finance Corporation
National Bank of Greece
Piraeus Bank
RCB Bank
Societe Generale Bank
USB Bank

Branches of foreign banks in Cyprus
Arab Jordan Investment Bank
Avtovazbank
Bank of Beirut
Banque du Liban et d’Outre-Mer S.A.L.
BankMed
Banque BEMO
Banque SBA
Barclays
BBAC
Byblos Bank
Central Cooperative Bank
Credit Libanais
EFG Bank (Luxembourg)
Expobank
FBME Bank
First Investment Bank
IBL Bank
Jordan Ahli Bank
Jordan Kuwait Bank
Lebanon & Gulf Bank
National Bank of Greece
PrivatBank
Promsvyazbank
Saxo Bank
Trasta Komercbanka

Representative offices of foreign banks in Cyprus
AtlasMont banka
Bank Zenit

Defunct Banks
Cyprus Popular Bank

Czech Republic

Central bank
Czech National Bank

Commercial and savings banks
Česká exportní banka
Česká spořitelna
Českomoravská stavební spořitelna
Českomoravská záruční a rozvojová banka
Československá obchodní banka (using also Poštovní spořitelna brand)
Equa Bank
ERB bank
Expobank CZ
Fio banka
GE Money Bank
Hypoteční banka
J&T Banka
Komerční Banka
Modrá pyramida stavební spořitelna
PPF banka
Raiffeisen stavební spořitelna
Raiffeisenbank, a.s.
Sberbank CZ
Stavební spořitelna České spořitelny
UniCredit Bank Czech Republic and Slovakia
Wüstenrot hypoteční banka
Wüstenrot - stavební spořitelna

Branch offices of foreign banks
AXA Bank Europe
Bank Gutmann Aktiengesellschaft
The Bank of Tokyo-Mitsubishi UFJ
BRE Bank (using brand mBank) 
Commerzbank Aktiengesellschaft
Deutsche Bank Aktiengesellschaft
Fortis Bank
HSBC Bank plc
ING Bank
Meinl Bank Aktiengesellschaf
Oberbank AG
Poštová banka a.s.
Raiffeisenlandesbank Oberösterreich
Raiffeisenbank im Stiftland eG
Saxo Bank A/S
The Royal Bank of Scotland plc
Volksbank Löbau-Zittau eG
Všeobecná úverová banka
Waldviertler Sparkasse von 1842 AG
Zuno Bank AG

Denmark

Estonia

Finland

France
Banque Martin Maurel
BNP Paribas
BPCE
Banque Populaire
Caisse d'épargne
Natixis
Banque Palatine
CM-CIC
Crédit Industriel et Commercial
Crédit Mutuel*
Crédit Agricole
Crédit Agricole Corporate and Investment Bank
Crédit Agricole Indosuez
Crédit Lyonnais (LCL)
Crédit du Nord
Banque Courtois
Banque Kolb
Banque Laydernier
Banque Rhône-alpes
Banque Tarneaud
Deutsche Bank
HSBC France
La Banque postale
Société Générale

See the exhaustive list of banks operating in France, on the FBF website

Georgia

Germany

Gibraltar
Banco Galliano
Xapo

Greece

Guernsey

Hungary

BNP Paribas Bank
Budapest Bank

CIB Bank
Citibank Hungary (owned by Citicorp)
Commerzbank
Credigen Bank
Deutsche Bank
Duna Takarék Bank
Erste Bank
Gránit Bank
ING Bank
K&H Bank
KDB Bank
MagNet Bank
Magyar Cetelem Bank
MNB Magyar Nemzeti Bank 
MTB Magyar Takarékszövetkezeti Bank 
Merkantil Bank
MKB Bank (formerly Magyar Külkereskedelmi Bank)
Oberbank
OTP Bank
OTP Jelzálogbank 
Polgári Bank
Raiffeisen Bank
Sberbank
Sopron Bank
TAKARÉKBANK 
Takarék Jelzálogbank 
Unicredit Bank

Iceland

Ireland

Central bank 
Central Bank of Ireland

Commercial banks 
Allied Irish Banks
Bank of Ireland
KBC Bank Ireland (formerly IIB Bank)
Permanent TSB
Ulster Bank

Isle of Man

Italy

Jersey

Latvia

Liechtenstein

Makro Bancas

Lithuania

Makro Bancas

Luxembourg

Advanzia Bank
Banque de Luxembourg
Banque et Caisse d'Épargne de l'État
Banque Internationale à Luxembourg
BGL BNP Paribas
Clearstream (clearing chamber)
Commercial EU Bank,S.A.
Deutsche Bank
 Hauck & Aufhäuser Privatbankiers KGaA 
ING
KBL Kredietbank Luxembourg
P&T Luxembourg
Raiffeisenbank/Banque Raiffeisen
 VP Bank (Luxembourg) S.A.

North Macedonia

Alpha Bank Skopje (Alpha Bank group)
IK Banka
Invest Banka
Sparkasse Bank
Komercijalna Banka Skopje
NLB Tutunska banka (member of Nova Ljubljanska Banka Group)
Ohridska Banka (Société Générale group)
ProCredit Bank
Stopanska Banka (member of National Bank of Greece Group)
UNI Banka
Ziraat Banka AD Skopje (member of Ziraat Bankası)

Malta

Akbank T.A.S.
APS Bank Limited
Banif Bank (Malta) PLC
Bank of Valletta PLC
BAWAG Malta Bank Limited
CommBank Europe Limited
Deutsche Bank (Malta) Limited
Erste Bank (Malta)Limited
FCM Bank Limited
FIMBank plc
Fortis Bank Malta Limited
HSBC Bank Malta PLC
IIG Bank (Malta) Limited
Investkredit International Bank PLC
Izola Bank plc
Lombard Bank Malta PLC
MeDirect Bank Malta
NBG Bank Malta Limited
Nemea Bank Limited
Raiffeisen Malta PLC
Saadgroup Bank Europe Limited
Satabank
Sparkasse Bank Malta PLC
Turkiye Garanti Bankasi A S
VoiceCash Bank Limited

Complete list as of June 6, 2012, based on official lists available at Malta Financial Services Authority

Moldova

Monaco

Montenegro

Central bank
 Central bank of Montenegro

Commercial banks
Atlasmont banka (Atlas grupa)
Addiko Bank
Komercijalna banka Budva
Crnogorska komercijalna banka (OTP Bank group, 100% takeover by Hungarian OTP Bank for €105 million)
Mortgage Bank Podgorica
Nikšićka banka
NLB Montenegrobanka (Nova ljubljanska banka group)
Erste Bank AD Podgorica
Pljevaljska banka (Atlas grupa)
Podgorička banka (Société Générale group)

Netherlands

Central bank
De Nederlandsche Bank N.V.

Development Bank
FMO (Netherlands)

Major banks
ABN AMRO Bank N.V.
ING Bank N.V.
Rabobank

Savings and other banks
Achmea Bank Holding N.V.
Aegon Bank N.V.
AlpInvest Partners
Amsterdam Trade Bank N.V.
Bank Insinger de Beaufort N.V.
Bank Mendes Gans N.V.
Bank Nederlandse Gemeenten
Bank of New York Mellon
Bank Ten Cate & Cie. N.V.
Binck N.V.
Bunq
Demir Halk Bank N.V.
Deutsche Bank
Effectenbank Stroeve N.V.
F. van Lanschot Bankiers N.V.
Friesland Bank N.V.
Garantibank International N.V.
GWK Bank N.V.
KAS BANK N.V.
KBC Bank N.V. Nederland
Knab
Netherlands Development Finance Company (FMO)
NIBC Bank
Petercam Bank N.V.
SNS Bank N.V.
Staalbankiers N.V.
Theodoor Gilissen Bankiers N.V.
Triodos Bank
 Yapi Kredi Bank Nederland N.V.
Van Lanschot

Defunct or merged banks

ABN (Algemene Bank Nederland)
AMRO Bank (Amsterdamsche Rotterdamsche Bank)
ASR Bank and AMEV Bank N.V., merged with Fortis ASR
Bank Bercoop
CenE Bankiers, part of Van Lanschot Bankiers
DSB Bank, went bankrupt in 2009
Fortis N.V.
Hollandsche Bank-Unie, acquired by Deutsche Bank
Hope & Co., became part of MeesPierson under ABN AMRO
Kempen & Co, merged with Van Lanschot Bankiers
Nederlandsche Handel-Maatschappij, became part of ABN AMRO
Nationale Handelsbank
Postbank N.V., now part of ING Bank N.V.
Scheurleer & Zoonen
Van der Hoop Bankiers, went bankrupt in 2005

Northern Cyprus

Norway

Central bank
Norges Bank

Commercial banks
Bank 1 Oslo
Bank2
Bank Norwegian
DnB NOR
DnB NOR Bank
Nordlandsbanken
Postbanken
Fokus Bank (subsidiary of Danske Bank)
Glitnir
Bolig- og Næringsbanken
Glitnir Bank
Handelsbanken (subsidiary of Svenska Handelsbanken)
Landkreditt Bank
Netfonds Bank
Nordea
Santander Consumer Bank (subsidiary of Banco Santander)
SEB Privatbanken (subsidiary of Skandinaviska Enskilda Banken)
Skandiabanken (subsidiary of Skandia)
Storebrand Bank
Verdibanken
Voss Veksel- og Landmandsbank

Public banks
Den norske stats Husbank
Kommunal Landspensjonskasse (KLP)
Statens lånekasse for utdanning

Savings banks
Cultura Sparebank
Haugesund Sparebank
Helgeland Sparebank
Rygge-Vaaler Sparebank
Sparebank 1
Sparebanken Hedmark
Sparebanken Midt-Norge
Sparebanken Nord-Norge
Sparebanken Rogaland
Sparebanken Møre
Sparebanken Pluss
Sparebanken Sogn og Fjordane
Sparebanken Sør
Sparebanken Vest
Sparebanken Øst
Terra-Gruppen

Poland

Central bank
 Narodowy Bank Polski

Commercial banks
 Alior Bank SA
 Bank BNP Paribas
 Bank BPH SA
 Bank Gospodarki Żywnościowej SA
 Bank Gospodarstwa Krajowego
 Bank Handlowy w Warszawie SA (Citigroup)
 Bank Millennium SA
 Bank Ochrony Środowiska
 Bank Pocztowy
 Bank Pekao SA
 Bank Polskiej Spółdzielczości SA
 Bank Zachodni WBK SA
 Credit Agricole Bank
 Euro Bank
 Getin Noble Bank
 Idea Bank
 ING Bank Śląski
 mBank
 Nest Bank
 Powszechna Kasa Oszczędności Bank Polski SA
 Plus Bank
 Raiffeisen Digital Bank
 Raiffeisen Polbank
 BPI Bank Polskich Inwestycji
 Banque PSA Finance SA Oddział w Polsce
 BNP PARIBAS SA Oddział w Polsce
 BNP Paribas Bank Polska SA
 Danske Bank A/S SA Oddział w Polsce
 Deutsche Bank PBC
 Deutsche Bank Polska
 Bank DnB NORD Polska SA
 Bank of Tokyo-Mitsubishi UFJ (Polska) SA
 Gospodarczy Bank Wielkopolski SA
 HSBC Bank Polska SA
 NORDEA BANK POLSKA SA
 Nykredit Realkredit A/S SA - Oddział w Polsce
 RCI Bank Polska SA
 Santander Consumer Bank 
 Skandinaviska Enskilda Banken AB (SA) - Oddział w Polsce
 Société Générale SA Oddział w Polsce
 Svenska Handelsbanken AB SA Oddział w Polsce
 FCA-Group Bank Polska
 Mercedes-Benz Bank Polska
 Toyota Bank Polska SA
 Volkswagen Bank Polska SA
 Banco Mais S.A. (SA) Oddział w Polsce

Portugal

Central bank
Banco de Portugal

Major banks
Abanca
ActivoBank 
Banco Angolano de Negócios e Comércio
Banco BAI Europa 
Banco Best 
Banco BIC
Banco BIG 
Banco Bilbao Vizcaya Argentaria 
Banco Carregosa
Banco CTT
Banco Comercial Português
Banco de Negócios Internacional
Banco do Brasil
Banco Efisa
Banco Finantia
Banco Internacional do Funchal 
Banco Invest
Banco Popular
Banco Português de Gestão
Banco Português de Investimento 
Banco Primus
Banco Privado Atlantico Europa
Banco Santander Totta
Banif Mais
Barclays
Caixa Geral de Depósitos 
Caja Duero
Crédito Agrícola
Deutsche Bank
Montepio Geral
Novo Banco

Romania

Central bank
Banca Naţională a României

Commercial banks
Alpha Bank 
BCR 
BRD – Groupe Société Générale  
Banca Românească - retail division of EximBank,
Banca Transilvania
BLOM Bank
BNP Paribas
CEC Bank 
Citibank - Corporate Bank,
Crédit Agricole
Credit Europe Bank 
EximBank
First Bank (Romania) 
Garanti Bank 
Idea Bank
ING Bank 
Intesa Sanpaolo 
Libra Internet Bank
OTP Bank
Patria Bank
Porsche Bank România
ProCredit Bank 
Raiffeisen Bank
TBI Bank
Unicredit Bank
Vista Bank

Russia

Sberbank
Vneshtorgbank
Gazprombank
Rosselkhozbank
Otkritiye
Alfa-Bank
Credit Bank of Moscow
Promsvyazbank
Unicredit Bank
Raiffaisen Bank
Rosbank
Ak Bars Bank

San Marino

Serbia

Central bank
 National Bank of Serbia

Commercial banks
 Addiko Bank (ex Hypo-Alpe Adria Bank)
 AIK banka Niš
 Banca Intesa Beograd (Intesa Sanpaolo group)
 Poštanska štedionica
 Bank of China Beograd
 Crédit Agricole Srbija (Crédit Agricole group)
 Direktna banka Kragujevac (ex KMB Banka)
 Expobank Beograd (ex Marfin Bank)
 Erste Bank Novi Sad (Erste Bank group)
 Eurobank a.d. (Eurobank Ergasias group)
 Halkbank ad Beograd (ex Čačanska Banka)
 Jubanka (Purchased by AIK banka Niš in April 2017)
 JUBMES banka
 Komercijalna banka
 Mirabank
 mts banka
 Mobi Banka a.d. Beograd
 NLB banka
 Opportunity banka
 OTP banka Srbija a.d. (OTP Bank group)
 Vojvođanska banka (OTP Bank group)
 ProCredit Bank
 Raiffeisenbank Beograd 
 Sberbank Srbija
 Srpska banka
 UniCredit Bank Serbia (UniCredit group)
 Apibank

Defunct banks
 Agrobanka
 Beobanka
 Kosovsko metohijska banka
 Panonska banka
 Privredna banka Beograd
 Razvojna banka Vojvodine
 Univerzal banka
 Zepter Banka

Slovakia

Central banks
 Eximbanka SR
 National Bank of Slovakia

Commercial and savings banks
 Československá obchodná banka, owned by KBC Bank (subsidiary of KBC Group NV)
 ČSOB Stavebná sporiteľňa
 OTP Banka Slovensko, member of OTP Bank
 Poštová banka, member of J&T
 Prima banka, member of Penta
 Privatbanka, member of Penta
 Prvá stavebná sporiteľňa
 Raiffeisen Bank
 Slovenská sporiteľňa, member of Erste Bank
 Slovenská záručná a rozvojová banka
 Tatra banka, member of Raiffeisen Zentralbank
 UniCredit Bank Czech Republic and Slovakia, member of UniCredit Group
 Všeobecná úverová banka, member of Intesa Sanpaolo
 Wüstenrot stavebná sporiteľňa

Branch offices of foreign banks

 BKS Bank AG
 BNP Paribas Personal Finance SA, member of BNP Paribas
 Calyon, member of Crédit Agricole
 Citibank Europe plc, member of Citigroup
 Cofidis SA, member of Groupe Cofidis Participations
 Commerzbank AG
 Fio Banka
 Ammado Finance
 J&T Banka, member of J&T Group
 KDB Bank Europe Ltd., member of Korea Development Bank
 Komerční banka Bratislava, owned by Komerční Banka (member of Société Générale)
 mBank, owned by BRE Bank SA, member of Commerzbank AG
 Oberbank AG

Slovenia

Spain

Sweden

Switzerland

AIG Private Bank
Alternative Bank Schweiz
Anker Bank
Arab Bank (Switzerland)
Banca del Gottardo
Banca della Svizzera Italiana (BSI)
Banca di Credito e Commercio
Banca Monte Paschi (Suisse)
Bank am Bellevue
Bank Jacob Safra
Bank Julius Baer
Bank Cler
Bank of New York - Inter Maritime Bank
Bank Sarasin
Bank Vontobel J. & Co. AG
Banque Alternative Suisse
Banque Bonhôte & Cie SA
Banque de promotion cofalys
Banque Diamantaire Anversoise (Suisse)
Banque Financière de la Cité (BFC)
Banque Franck SA - Johnson International Group
Banque Galland et Cie SA
Banque MeesPierson Gonet SA
Banque Multi Commerciale
Banque Pasche
Banque Piguet & Cie SA
Banque SCS Alliance
Baumann & Cie, Banquiers
BNP Suisse SA
Bordier & Cie
Caisse d'épargne du district de vevey
CIM Bank (CIM Banque)
Clariden Bank
Commercial EU Bank, S.A. Branch
Compagnie Bancaire Helvétique
Crédit Agricole Indosuez (Suisse) SA
Crédit Lyonnais Suisse
Credit Suisse Group
Darier Hentsch & Cie
Discount Bank and Trust Group
Deutsche Bank
E. Gutzwiller & Cie, Banquiers
Faisal Private Bank (Switzerland) SA
FinansBank
Gonet & Cie
Habib Bank AG Zurich
Hentsch Henchoz & Cie
Hottinger & Cie
Kantonalbank (German, French:Banque Cantonale, Italian: Banca Cantonale)
Aargauische Kantonalbank (AKB)
Appenzeller Kantonalbank (APPKB)
Banca dello Stato del Cantone Ticino (BancaStato)
Banque Cantonale de Berne (BEKB/BCBE)
Banque Cantonale de Fribourg (FKB)
Banque Cantonale de Genève (BCGE)
Banque Cantonale du Jura (BCJU)
Banque Cantonale du Valais (BWKB)
Banque cantonale neuchâteloise (BCN)
Banque cantonale vaudoise (BCV)
Basellandschaftliche Kantonalbank (BLKB)
Basler Kantonalbank (BKB)
Glarner Kantonalbank (GLKB)
Graubündner Kantonalbank (GKB)
Luzerner Kantonalbank (LUKB)
Nidwaldner Kantonabank (NWKB)
Obwaldner Kantonalbank (OWKB)
St.Galler Kantonalbank (SGKB)
Schwyzer Kantonalbank (SZKB)
Shaffauser Kantonalbank (SHKB)
Thurgauer Kantonalbank (TKB)
Urner Kantonalbank (URKB)
Zuger Kantonalbank (ZugerKB)
Zürcher Kantonalbank (ZKB)
Kanz Bank
La Roche & Co Banquiers
Lombard, Odier & Cie
Maerki, Baumann and Co. AG
Migros Bank
Mirabaud
Morval & Cie SA Banque
Pictet
Rabo Robeco Bank
Rahn & Bodmer Banquiers
Rosbank (Switzerland)
S&B Investment Bank
SG Ruegg Bank
Skandia Bank (Switzerland) AG
Solothurner Bank (Soba)
Swiss National Bank
Swissnetbank.com AG
UBS AG
Union Bancaire Privée
Union Suisse des Banques Raiffeisen (USBR)
Valiant Bank
Volksbank Bodensee AG
VP Bank (Schweiz) AG

Defunct or merged banks
Banca Unione di Credito acquired by Banca della Svizzera Italiana (BSI)
Bank Hofmann AG merged Clariden
Bank Leu Ltd merged Clariden
Bank von Ernst & Cie AG merged Coutts & Co.
Banque Edouard Constant merged EFG Privatebank SA
Ferrier Lullin et Cie SA merged UBS
Schweizerische Volksbank (SVB) bought (Credit Suisse Group)
Swiss Bank Corporation (SBE/SBS) merged
Union Bank of Switzerland (UBS/SBG) merged
Wegelin & Co

Turkey

Ukraine

Central bank
National Bank of Ukraine

Major banks
PrivatBank
Oschadbank
Ukreximbank
Raiffeisen Bank Aval (Raiffeisen Group)
Ukrsibbank (BNP Paribas Group)
UniCredit Bank
First Ukrainian International Bank
Alfa-Bank
Crédit Agricole

Local banks
Bank of Lviv
Citibank
ING Bank
KredoBank (PKO Bank Polski Group)
OTP Bank
Pivdennyi
Pravex Bank
ProCredit Bank
Deutsche Bank
Prominvestbank (Vnesheconombank Group)
Sberbank of Russia
Ukrgasbank
VTB

United Kingdom

Central bank
Bank of England

Major banks
Bank of Scotland, part of Lloyds Banking Group
Barclays
Clydesdale Bank, part of the Virgin Money UK
The Co-operative Bank
Executive Trust Bank
Northern Bank, trading as Danske Bank, part of Danske Bank Group, Denmark
Halifax (a trading name of Bank of Scotland), part of Lloyds Banking Group
HSBC UK, part of HSBC Holdings
Lloyds Bank, part of Lloyds Banking Group
NatWest, part of NatWest Group
Royal Bank of Scotland, part of NatWest Group
Santander UK, part of Banco Santander, Spain
Standard Chartered (trading overseas)
TSB Bank, part of Banco Sabadell, Spain
Ulster Bank, part of NatWest Group
Yorkshire Bank (a trading name of Clydesdale Bank), part of the Virgin Money UK

Other banks
Adam and Company (a trading name of The Royal Bank of Scotland), part of NatWest Group
Aldermore Bank
Allied Irish Bank, part of Allied Irish Banks
Al Rayan Bank, part of Masraf Al Rayan
Arbuthnot Latham & Co
Atom Bank
Bank Negara Indonesia
Bank and Clients
Bank of Ceylon (UK), part of Bank of Ceylon
Bank of Cyprus (UK), part of Bank of Cyprus
Bank of Ireland (UK), part of Bank of Ireland
Butterfield Private Bank
C. Hoare & Co
Cambridge & Counties Bank
Cater Allen Private Bank, subsidiary of Santander UK, part of Banco Santander
Child & Co (a branch of The Royal Bank of Scotland), part of NatWest Group
Coutts & Co (a subsidiary of National Westminster Bank), part of NatWest Group
Deutsche Bank
Drummonds Bank (a branch of The Royal Bank of Scotland), part of NatWest Group
Duncan Lawrie
First Trust Bank, part of Allied Irish Banks
Habib Bank AG Zurich
ICICI Bank UK, part of ICICI Bank
Isle of Man Bank (a trading name of RBS International), part of NatWest Group
Julian Hodge Bank
Kingdom Bank, independent Christian bank
Kleinwort Hambros Private Bank, part of Société Générale
M&S Bank, part of HSBC
Metro Bank
Monzo
National Bank of Kuwait (International), part of the National Bank of Kuwait
National Savings and Investments, an Executive Agency of the Chancellor of the Exchequer, backed by HM Treasury
ODE Banka
OneSavings Bank
Raphaels Bank, independent bank established 1787
Reliance Bank, owned by the Salvation Army
Sainsbury's Bank, owned by Sainsbury's
Shawbrook Bank
Starling Bank
Tandem Bank
Tesco Bank, owned by Tesco
Unity Trust Bank
Virgin Money
Wesleyan Bank

Previous building societies converted to banks
Abbey (previously Abbey National), now Santander UK
Alliance & Leicester, now Santander UK
Bradford & Bingley, savings and branch network now Santander UK; mortgage and loans books nationalised by HM Government
Britannia, now part of the Co-operative Bank
Cheltenham & Gloucester, savings and branch network now TSB Bank; mortgage and loans books part of Lloyds Bank
Northern Rock, savings and branch network now Virgin Money; mortgage and loans books nationalised by HM Government
The Woolwich, now part of Barclays Bank

See Building Society for list of current building societies. In particular, Nationwide Building Society would be included in the top 10 largest UK retail banks if demutualised.

Merged or defunct banks
African Banking Corporation
Anglo-Egyptian Bank
Bank of British West Africa
Bank of Credit and Commerce International
Bank of Liverpool
Bank of London and South America
Bank of Scotland (see also HBOS)
Barings Bank
British Linen Bank
Child & Co
Cox & Kings (see Lloyds TSB)
Egg
District Bank (constituent of National Westminster Bank)
National Girobank/Girobank (see Alliance & Leicester)
Glyn, Mills & Co. (constituent of Williams & Glyn)
Grindlays Bank
Gurney's Bank
Ionian Bank
Martins Bank (see Barclays Bank)
Morgan Grenfell & Company (now DB (UK) Bank)
National Commercial Bank of Scotland (see Royal Bank of Scotland)
National Provincial Bank (constituent of National Westminster Bank)
P&O Bank
Parr's Bank
Trustee Savings Bank (see Lloyds Bank)
Wallace Smith Trust
Westminster Bank (constituent of NatWest Group)
Williams & Glyn's Bank (see Royal Bank of Scotland)
Williams Deacon's Bank (constituent of Williams & Glyn's Bank)

An extensive list of British banks can be found in Wellings and Gibb, Bibliography of Banking Histories  Vol. I: Domestic Banks (1995)

Vatican City
Vatican Bank

See also 

 Central banks and currencies of Europe
 Economy of Europe
 European Central Bank
 List of banks
 List of banks in Africa
 List of banks in the Americas
 List of central banks
 List of currencies in Europe
 List of European stock exchanges

References